Policy Network is an international progressive think tank based in London. The President of Policy Network is former UK First Secretary of State and EU Trade Commissioner Lord Mandelson; Lord Liddle (former Special Adviser to President of the European Commission José Manuel Barroso) is Chairperson.

Policy Network seeks to promote strategic thinking on progressive solutions to the challenges of the 21st century and the future of social democracy. It organises debates and conducts research on policy and political challenges.

Policy Network's work has been featured in media outlets such as The Economist, the Financial Times, the BBC, The Guardian, The Telegraph, Le Monde, Die Zeit, the Chicago Tribune, and The Huffington Post.

In May 2021, Policy Network merged with Progress to form Progressive Britain.

Website
Policy Network's website hosts the Policy Network Observatory, a forum for ideas and policy debate. The Policy Network Observatory also hosts a monthly insight bulletin, The State of the Left, which includes insider analyses of the political climate in a number of countries around the world. In 2010 Policy Network launched its opinion poll tracker, which tracks the fortunes of Europe's social democratic parties on a cross-comparative basis. Many articles on the Policy Network Observatory have been re-published by the New Statesman and The Guardian and some are also translated into French at Toute L’Europe and Spanish at Agenda Pública and promoted by Policy Network's partner organisations in Belgium, the Netherlands, France, Germany, Sweden, Spain, and Italy. Significant figures who have contributed commissioned articles for the Policy Network Observatory include: Enrico Letta, Lodewijk Asscher, Thomas Piketty, Jason Furman, Sir Julian Priestley, Andrew Duff, Richard Corbett, Andrés Velasco, Lawrence Summers, David Held, Lord Mandelson, Pascal Lamy, Jacob Hacker, Lord Giddens, Michael Lind, Colin Crouch, Elaine Byrne, John Kay, Andrew Gamble, Sir Paul Collier, James K. Galbraith, and Mariana Mazzucato.

Current work programmes
Under conditions of globalisation and European integration, the distinction between national and international problems has become increasingly blurred. Understanding the relationship between the domestic and the international informs Policy Network's work across three areas:
 The renewal of social democracy
 Europe's economic and social models
 The politics of multi-level governance and institutional reform

Specific topics include: welfare state and labour market reform, globalisation, European Union, economic governance, industrial policy, climate change and energy, and migration and integration.

Current or recent projects include economic and public service reform; migration, integration and political trust; and the future of the post-financial crisis global economy.

Progressive Governance Network 

The Progressive Governance Network, for which Policy Network acts as the secretariat, brings together progressive heads of state, government ministers, politicians and intellectuals from across the world to address the challenges of globalization. The network's stated goal is to enhance co-operation and links between key progressive policymakers and academics as well as to provide a meeting place for exchanging concrete policies and practices. The Progressive Governance Network was launched in 1999 by U.S. President Bill Clinton, Prime Minister of the United Kingdom Tony Blair, Chancellor of Germany Gerhard Schröder, Prime Minister of the Netherlands Wim Kok, and Prime Minister of Italy Massimo D'Alema.

Since its formation in 1999, Progressive Governance conferences have been held in Chile, the United Kingdom, the United States, South Africa, Germany, Norway and Sweden. These conferences have often been hosted by incumbent heads of state including; Chilean President, Michelle Bachelet in 2009; UK Prime Minister, Gordon Brown in 2010; Norwegian Prime Minister, Jens Stoltenberg in 2011, and Irish Tánaiste Eamon Gilmore in 2012. Participants have included Brazilian presidents Fernando Henrique Cardoso and Luiz Inácio Lula da Silva; U.S. Vice President Joe Biden; Director-General of the World Trade Organization Pascal Lamy; and Spanish Prime Minister José Luis Rodriguez Zapatero. The 2013 Progressive Governance conference was hosted by the Prime Minister of Denmark Helle Thorning-Schmidt in Copenhagen in April 2013.

Board members

President

Peter Mandelson, Baron Mandelson: Former UK first secretary of state, business secretary and EU Trade commissioner

Co-Chairs

 Roger Liddle, Baron Liddle: Labour front bench spokesperson on Europe in the House of Lords.
 Patrick Diamond: Senior research fellow at Policy Network and former head of long-term policy in the UK Prime Minister's Office, 10 Downing Street. Formerly group director of policy at the Equality and Human Rights Commission.

Board

 Andrew Adonis, Baron Adonis: Labour member of the House of Lords. Former head of the Number 10 Policy Unit and former Minister of State for Education and former Secretary of State for Transport.
 Stephen Beer: Senior fund manager, central finance board of the Methodist Church.
 Matt Browne: Fellow at the Center for American Progress, previously director of public affairs in APCO Worldwide’s London office.
 Andrew Gamble: Professor of Politics at the University of Sheffield and emeritus professor of Politics at the University of Cambridge.
 Stephen Hockman QC: Joint head of chambers at 6 Pump Court. He specialises in regulatory law and was chairman of the bar in 2006. He is chair of the Society of Labour Lawyers.
 Jürgen Krönig: Broadcaster and author, commentator for the German weekly Die Zeit and various other publications in Germany, Switzerland and Britain.
 Giles Radice, Baron Radice: Labour member of the House of Lords, formerly Labour member of parliament for North Durham 1972–2001.
 Helen Wallace: Expert and author on the politics of European integration and has held posts at the London School of Economics, the European University Institute, the University of Sussex and at Chatham House.

Publications
 Florian Ranft, Martin Adler, Patrick Diamond, Eugenia Guerrero, and Matthew Laza, Freeing the Road, 2016
 Lucia Quaglia and Waltraud Schelkle, EU economic governance after Brexit, 2016
 Andrew Duff, After Brexit, 2016
 Matthias Machnig and Oliver Schmolke, Distributing the Future, 2016
 Jonathan Ashworth, Sunny Ways: Learning from Success and Failure in Canada, 2016
 Helen Thompson and Leila Simona Talani, The impact of Brexit on the City and the British economic model, 2016
 Frans Timmermans, Community: Discovering Ties That Bind, 2016
 Jake Sumner, Building for Generation Rent, 2016
 Daniel Sage, Young people at risk: Challenges and policy options for the UK, 2016
 Greg McClymont and Andy Tarrant, Towards a New Pensions Settlement, 2016
 Andrew Duff, Britain's special status in Europe, 2016
 Roger Liddle, Baron Liddle, The Risk of Brexit, 2015
 Pat McFadden and Andy Tarrant, What would 'out' look like?, 2015
 Claudia Chwalisz and Patrick Diamond, The Predistribution Agenda, 2015
 Britain's EU renegotiation: the view from our partners, 2015
 Patrick Diamond and Giles Radice, Can Labour Win?, 2015
 Sofia Vasilopoulou, Mixed feelings: Britain's conflicted attitudes to the EU before the referendum, 2015
 
 Damian Chalmers, "Democratic Self-Government in Europe", 2013
 "Immigration, Work and Welfare", Elena Jurado, Grete Brochmann, and Jon Erik Dølvik (eds), 2013
 Stephen Hockman, "Legislating for Responsible Capitalism", 2012
 On Growth, Larry Summers, 2012
 Rebalancing What?, Mariana Mazzucato, 2012
 Jacob Hacker, "The Institutional Foundations of Middle Class Democracy", 2011
 Colin Crouch, "Is There a Liberalism Beyond Social Democracy?", 2011
 Graeme Cooke, Adam Lent, Anthony Painter, and Hopi Sen, "In the Black Labour: Why Fiscal Conservatism and Social Justice Go Hand-in-hand", 2011
 Alfredo Cabral and Priya Shankar, "Brazil Rising: The Prospects of an Emerging Power", 2011
 Patrick Diamond and Giles Radice, "Southern Discomfort Again", 2010
 Lauren M. McLaren, "Cause for Concern? The Impact of Immigration on Political Trust", 2010
 Priya Shankar, "Old Player, New Role? India in a Multi-polar World", 2010
 David Hetherington and Tim Soutphommasane, "What's the Story? Nation-building Narratives in Australian Climate Politics", 2010
 David Held and Angus Fane Hervey, "Democracy, climate change and global governance", 2009

Partner think tanks 
Friedrich-Ebert-Stiftung
European Policy Centre
Progressive Policy Institute
Center for American Progress
Wiardi Beckman Stichting

Funding 
Policy Network has been given a C grade for funding transparency by Who Funds You?

Policy Network discloses the identities of its funders on its website, but does not reveal how much money each funder provided. According to its website: "In 2016, Policy Network received core funding from Lord Sainsbury of Turville. In addition, support for specific projects was received from the Barrow Cadbury Fund; European Commission; Friedrich Ebert Stiftung (FES); RSPB; Nissan Europe; Aberdeen Asset Management; Bertelsmann Stiftung and Foundation of European Progressive Studies (Feps). Event sponsorship was also received from E!Sharp; Greenberg Quinlan Rosner Research;  TechUK; Deutsche Börse and Gatsby."

See also 
Post-democracy
Precariat
Predistribution
Third Way

References

Public policy think tanks based in the United Kingdom
Political and economic think tanks based in the United Kingdom
Social democracy